Khorixas is a town of 6,000 inhabitants in southern Kunene Region, Namibia. It was the capital of the Damaraland bantustan before Namibia's independence. It is the administrative capital of Khorixas Constituency. Most of the inhabitants are from the Damara ethnic group. The town is located near to an important deposit of petrified wood and the Twyfelfontein valley, known for its rock art.

Economy and infrastructure

Khorixas  from a lack of economic development and employment opportunities, which leads to frustration and outward migration among many of the town's youth. The unemployment rate in town is estimated to be around 70%. Donkerhoek, the town's informal settlement, has neither water nor electricity.

The regional hospital and some other regional offices are still located in Khorixas, though the capital of Kunene Region is Opuwo. Khorixas has a landing strip nine kilometers east of town parallel to the main road C39. The Runway Numbers are 09/27 and elevation is 3320 feet.

There are six schools and one branch of University of Namibia (UNAM) in Khorixas, Versteendewoud is the biggest primary school and Cornelius Goreseb High School is the biggest secondary school. Other schools are: Eddie Bowe Primary School, Welwitchia Primary School, Welwitchia Junior Secondary School and Th. F. ǃGaeb Primary School.

Politics
Khorixas is governed by a town council that has seven seats. Due to its location in former Damaraland, the ethnically Damara-based United Democratic Front (UDF) has strong support in the population. Unlike in most other constituencies of Namibia, the ruling SWAPO party had until 2015 never won in Khorixas.

Local authority elections
The 2015 local authority election was won by SWAPO, gaining four seats (1,741 votes) and the majority in the village council. The remaining three seats went to the UDF with 1,345 votes. The 2020 local authority election was won by the UDF which gained 985 votes and four seats. SWAPO was runner up with 624 votes and two seats. The remaining seat went to the Landless People's Movement (LPM, a new party registered in 2018, 261 votes).

Mayors
 2005 Martha Claassen, UDF. Claassen was the first female mayor of Khorixas but her reign lasted only three days.
 2012–2015 Trypohasa Moloto, UDF.
 2015–2020: Elizabeth Geises, SWAPO

Geography

Climate
Khorixas has a semi-arid climate (BSh, according to the Köppen climate classification), with warm to hot summers and mild winters. It borders on a desert climate (BWh).

Sport
The Robber Chanties, which in August 2010 played in the Northern Stream Division One and sought promotion the Namibia Premier League, are based in Khorixas.

Sights 
 Organ Pipes
 Burnt Mountain

References

External links

Populated places in the Kunene Region
Towns in Namibia